Cherin was a legendary king of the Britons as recounted in Geoffrey of Monmouth's Historia Regum Britanniae. His father was King Porrex II and he was succeeded by his three sons in turn, Fulgenius, Edadus, and Andragius.

References

2nd-century BC legendary rulers
Legendary British kings